In combinatorics, a  difference set is a subset  of size  of a group  of order  such that every non-identity element of  can be expressed as a product  of elements of  in exactly  ways. A difference set  is said to be cyclic, abelian, non-abelian, etc., if the group  has the corresponding property. The term "difference set" arises in this way.

Basic facts
 A simple counting argument shows that there are exactly  pairs of elements from  that will yield nonidentity elements, so every difference set must satisfy the equation 
 The complement of a -difference set is a -difference set.
Each block of the design consists of  points, each point is contained in  blocks. Any two blocks have exactly  elements in common and any two points are simultaneously contained in exactly  blocks. The group  acts as an automorphism group of the design. It is sharply transitive on both points and blocks. 
 In particular, if , then the difference set gives rise to a projective plane. An example of a (7,3,1) difference set in the group  is the subset . The translates of this difference set form the Fano plane.
 Since every difference set gives a symmetric design, the parameter set must satisfy the Bruck–Ryser–Chowla theorem.
 Not every symmetric design gives a difference set.

Equivalent and isomorphic difference sets

Equivalent difference sets are isomorphic, but there exist examples of isomorphic difference sets which are not equivalent.  In the cyclic difference set case, all known isomorphic difference sets are equivalent.

Multipliers

It has been conjectured that if p is a prime dividing  and not dividing v, then the group automorphism defined by  fixes some translate of D (this is equivalent to being a multiplier). It is known to be true for  when  is an abelian group, and this is known as the First Multiplier Theorem.

For example, 2 is a multiplier of the (7,3,1)-difference set mentioned above.

Parameters
The known difference sets or their complements have one of the following parameter sets:

-difference set for some prime power  and some positive integer . These are known as the classical parameters and there are many constructions of difference sets having these parameters.
-difference set for some positive integer  A difference set with these parameters is a Hadamard difference set.
-difference set for some prime power  and some positive integer  Known as the McFarland parameters.
-difference set for some positive integer  Known as the Spence parameters.
-difference set for some prime power  and some positive integer  Difference sets with these parameters are called Davis-Jedwab-Chen difference sets.

Known difference sets
In many constructions of difference sets, the groups that are used are related to the additive and multiplicative groups of finite fields. The notation used to denote these fields differs according to discipline. In this section,  is the Galois field of order  where  is a prime or prime power.

 Paley -difference set:
Let  be a prime power. In the group , let  be the set of all non-zero squares.

 Singer -difference set: 
Let . Then the set  is a -difference set, where  is the trace function 

In the group , let

History
The systematic use of cyclic difference sets and methods for the construction of symmetric block designs dates back to R. C. Bose and a seminal paper of his in 1939. However, various examples appeared earlier than this, such as the "Paley Difference Sets" which date back to 1933. The generalization of the cyclic difference set concept to more general groups is due to R.H. Bruck in 1955. Multipliers were introduced by Marshall Hall Jr. in 1947.

Application

It is found by Xia, Zhou and Giannakis that difference sets can be used to construct a complex vector codebook that achieves the difficult Welch bound on maximum cross correlation amplitude. The so-constructed codebook also forms the so-called Grassmannian manifold.

Generalisations

A difference set is a difference family with  The parameter equation above generalises to  
The development  of a difference family is a 2-design.

See also
Combinatorial design

Notes

References

Further reading

 
 .  

 

Combinatorics